The United States is a highly developed mixed economy. It is the world's largest economy by nominal GDP, and the second-largest by purchasing power parity (PPP) behind China. It has the world's seventh-highest per capita GDP (nominal) and the eighth-highest per capita GDP (PPP) as of 2022. The U.S. accounted for 24.7% of the global economy in 2022 in nominal terms, and around 15.5% in PPP terms. The U.S. dollar is the currency of record most used in international transactions and is the world's foremost reserve currency, backed by a large U.S. treasuries market, its role as the reference standard for the petrodollar system, and its linked eurodollar. Several countries use it as their official currency and in others it is the de facto currency.

The American  economy is fueled by high productivity, political stability, a well-developed passenger and freight transportation infrastructure, and abundant natural resources. Americans have the highest average household and employee income among OECD member states. In 2021, they had the highest median household income. The U.S. has one of the world's highest income inequalities among the developed countries. The largest U.S. trading partners are Canada, Mexico, China, Japan, Germany, South Korea, the United Kingdom, Taiwan, India, and Vietnam. The U.S. is the world's largest importer and second-largest exporter. It has free trade agreements with several countries, including the USMCA, Australia, South Korea, Israel, and several others that are in effect or under negotiation. 

By 1890, the United States had overtaken the British Empire as the world's most productive economy. It is the world's largest producer of petroleum and natural gas. In 2016, it was the world's largest trading country as well as its third-largest manufacturer, representing a fifth of the global manufacturing output. The U.S. not only has the largest internal market for goods, but also dominates the services trade. U.S. total trade amounted to $4.2trillion in 2018. Of the world's 500 largest companies, 121 are headquartered in the U.S. The U.S. has the world's highest number of billionaires, with a total wealth of $3.0trillion. US commercial banks had $20trillion in assets as of August 2020. U.S. global assets under management had more than $30trillion in assets. During the Great Recession of 2008, the U.S. economy suffered a significant decline. The American Reinvestment and Recovery Act was passed by the US administration, and in the years that followed, the U.S. experienced the longest economic expansion on record by July 2019.

The New York Stock Exchange and Nasdaq are the world's largest stock exchanges by market capitalization and trade volume. In 2014, the U.S. economy is ranked first in international ranking on venture capital and global research and development funding. Consumer spending comprised 68% of the U.S. economy in 2018, while its labor share of income was 43% in 2017. The U.S. has the world's largest consumer market. The nation's labor market has attracted immigrants from all over the world and its net migration rate is among the highest in the world. The U.S. is one of the top-performing economies in studies such as the Ease of Doing Business Index, the Global Competitiveness Report, and others.

History

Colonial era and 18th century

The economic history of the United States began with British settlements along the Eastern seaboard in the 17th and 18th centuries. After 1700, the United States gained population rapidly, and imports as well as exports grew along with it. Africa, Asia, and most frequently Europe, contributed to the trade of the colonies. These 13 colonies gained independence from the British Empire in the late 18th century and quickly grew from colonial economies towards an economy focused on agriculture.

19th century

In 180 years, the U.S. grew to become a huge, integrated, and industrialized economy that made up around one-fifth of the world economy. As a result, the U.S. GDP per capita converged on and eventually surpassed that of the British Empire, as well as other countries that it previously trailed economically. The economy maintained high wages, attracting immigrants by the millions from all over the world. In the 1820s and 1830s, mass production replaced artisans with factories. New government regulations strengthened patents.

In the early 1800s, the United States was largely agricultural, with more than 80 percent of the population engaged in farming. Most of the manufacturing centered on the first stages of the transformation of raw materials, with lumber and sawmills, textiles, and boots and shoes leading the way. The rich resource endowments contributed to the rapid economic expansion of the nineteenth century. Ample land availability allowed the number of farmers to keep growing, but activity in manufacturing, services, transportation, and other sectors grew at a much faster pace. Thus, by 1860, the share of the rural population in the U.S. had fallen from over 80 percent to roughly 50 percent. 

In the 19th century, recessions frequently coincided with financial crises. The 1837 Panic was followed by a five-year depression marked by bank failures and then-record-high unemployment levels. Because of the great changes in the economy over the centuries, it is difficult to compare the severity of modern recessions to early recessions. Recessions after World War II appear to have been less severe than earlier recessions, but the reasons for this are unclear.

20th century

At the beginning of the century, new innovations and improvements in existing innovations opened the door for improvements in the standard of living among American consumers. Many firms grew large by taking advantage of economies of scale and better communication to run nationwide operations. Concentration in these industries raised fears of monopolies that would drive prices higher and output lower, but many of these firms were cutting costs so fast that trends were towards lower prices and more output in these industries. Many workers shared the success of these large firms, which typically offered the highest wages in the world.

The United States has been the world's largest national economy in terms of GDP since at least the 1920s. For many years following the Great Depression of the 1930s, when the danger of recession appeared most serious, the government strengthened the economy by spending heavily itself or cutting taxes so that consumers would spend more and by fostering rapid growth in the money supply, which also encouraged more spending. Ideas about the best tools for stabilizing the economy changed substantially between the 1930s and the 1980s. From the New Deal era that began in 1933 to the Great Society initiatives of the 1960s, national policymakers relied principally on fiscal policy to influence the economy.

During the world wars of the twentieth century, the United States fared better than the rest of the combatants because none of the First World War and relatively little of the Second World War were fought on American territory (and none on the then-48 states). Yet, even in the United States, the wars meant sacrifice. During the peak of Second World War activity, nearly 40 percent of U.S. GDP was devoted to war production. Decisions about large swaths of the economy were largely made for military purposes, and nearly all relevant inputs were allocated to the war effort. Many goods were rationed, prices and wages controlled, and many durable consumer goods were no longer produced. Large segments of the workforce were inducted into the military and paid half their wages; roughly half of those were sent into harm's way. 

The approach, advanced by British economist John Maynard Keynes, gave elected officials a leading role in directing the economy since spending and taxes are controlled by the U.S. president and Congress. The "Baby Boom" saw a dramatic increase in fertility in the period 1942–1957; it was caused by delayed marriages and childbearing during the depression years, a surge in prosperity, a demand for suburban single-family homes (as opposed to inner city apartments), and new optimism about the future. The boom peaked around 1957 and then began to fade. A period of high inflation, interest rates, and unemployment after 1973 weakened confidence in fiscal policy as a tool for regulating the overall pace of economic activity.

The U.S. economy grew by an average of 3.8% from 1946 to 1973, while real median household income surged by 74% (or 2.1% a year).

Since the 1970s, several emerging countries have begun to close the economic gap with the United States. In most cases, this has been due to moving the manufacture of goods formerly made in the U.S. to countries where they could be made for sufficiently less money to cover the cost of shipping plus a higher profit. In other cases, some countries have gradually learned to produce the same products and services that previously only the U.S. and a few other countries could produce. Real income growth in the U.S. has slowed. In the 1970s and 1980s, it was popular in the U.S. to believe that Japan's economy would surpass that of the U.S., but this did not occur.

21st century

The United States economy experienced a recession in 2001 with an unusually slow jobs recovery, with the number of jobs not regaining the February 2001 level until January 2005. This "jobless recovery" overlapped with the building of a housing bubble and arguably a wider debt bubble, as the ratio of household debt to GDP rose from a record level of 70% in Q1 2001 to 99% in Q1 2008. Homeowners were borrowing against their bubble-priced homes to fuel consumption, driving up their debt levels while providing an unsustainable boost to GDP. When housing prices began falling in 2006, the value of securities backed by mortgages fell dramatically, causing the equivalent of a bank run in the essentially unregulated non-depository banking system, which had outgrown the traditional, regulated depository banking system. Many mortgage companies and other non-depository banks (e.g., investment banks) faced a worsening crisis in 2007–2008, with the banking crisis peaking in September 2008, with the bankruptcy of Lehman Brothers and bailouts of several other financial institutions.

The Bush administration (2001–2009) and Obama administrations (2009–2017) applied banking bailout programs and Keynesian stimulus via high government deficits, while the Federal Reserve maintained near-zero interest rates. These measures helped the economy recover, as households paid down debts in 2009–2012, the only years since 1947 where this occurred, presenting a significant barrier to recovery. Real GDP regained its pre-crisis (late 2007) peak by 2011, household net worth by Q2 2012, non-farm payroll jobs by May 2014, and the unemployment rate by September 2015. Each of these variables continued into post-recession record territory following those dates, with the U.S. recovery becoming the second longest on record in April 2018.

A significant recession, as defined lost economic output, occurred during the financial crisis of 2007–2008, when GDP fell by 5.0% from the spring of 2008 to the spring of 2009. Other significant recessions took place in 1957–1958, when GDP fell 3.7% following the 1973 oil crisis, with a 3.1% fall from late 1973 to early 1975, and in the 1981–1982 recession, when GDP dropped by 2.9%. Recent, mild recessions have included the 1990–1991 downturn, when output fell by 1.3%, and the 2001 recession, in which GDP slid by 0.3%; the 2001 downturn lasted just eight months.  The most vigorous, sustained periods of growth, on the other hand, took place from early 1961 to mid-1969, with an expansion of 53% (5.1% a year), from mid-1991 to late 2000, at 43% (3.8% a year), and from late 1982 to mid-1990, at 37% (4% a year).

Debt held by the public, a measure of national debt, has risen throughout the 21st century. Rising from 31% in 2000 to 52% in 2009, and reaching 77% of GDP in 2017, the U.S. ranked 43rd highest in debt out of 207 countries. Income inequality peaked in 2007 and fell during the Great Recession, yet still ranked 41st highest among 156 countries in 2017 (i.e., 74% of countries had a more equal income distribution).

COVID-19 pandemic

In the first two quarters of 2020 amid Donald Trump's presidency, the U.S. economy suffered major setbacks beginning in March 2020, due to the novel coronavirus and having to "shut-down" major sectors of the American economy. As of March 2020, US exports of automobiles and industrial machines had plummeted as a result of the worldwide pandemic. Social distancing measures which took effect in March 2020, and which negatively impacted the demand for goods and services, resulted in the US GDP declining at a 4.8% annualized rate in the first quarter, the steepest pace of contraction in output since the fourth quarter of 2008. US retails sales dropped a record 8.7% in March alone. The US airline industry had also been hit hard, seeing a sharp decline in its revenues. The COVID-19 recession has been widely described as the most severe global economic downturn since the Great Depression and "far worse" than the Great Recession.

In May 2020, CNN gave an analysis based on unemployment data that the US economy was perhaps the worst that it had been since the 1930s. By May 8, the US had reached a record 14.7 percent unemployment, with 20.5 million jobs lost in April. The Chairman of the US Federal Reserve, Jerome Powell, warned that it may take "an extended time" before the US economy fully recovers from weak economic growth, due to the pandemic, and that in the foreseeable future the US can expect "low productivity growth and stagnant incomes". By 31 May 2020, more than forty million Americans had filed for unemployment benefits.

By June 2020, the slump in US continental flights due to the coronavirus pandemic had resulted in the US government temporarily halting service of fifteen US airlines to 75 domestic airports. The New York Times  reported on June 10, 2020, that "the United States budget deficit grew to a record $1.88trillion for the first eight months of this fiscal year."

The US economy increased 5.7% in 2021, which was its best performance since Ronald Reagan's presidency (1981–1989).

2021–2022 marked a historical inflation surge in the United States, with the Consumer Price Index inflation rate hitting 9.1%  higher in June 2022 than June 2021 constituting a 41-year high inflation rate with critics blaming the Federal Reserve among other factors.

Data
The following table shows the main economic indicators in 1980–2021 (with IMF staff estimates in 2022–2027). Inflation below 5% is in green.

GDP

U.S. nominal GDP was $19.5trillion in 2017. Annualized, nominal GDP reached $20.1trillion in Q1 2018, the first time it exceeded $20trillion. About 70% of U.S. GDP is personal consumption, with business investment 18%, government 17% (federal, state and local but excluding transfer payments such as Social Security, which is in consumption) and net exports a negative 3% due to the U.S. trade deficit. Real gross domestic product, a measure of both production and income, grew by 2.3% in 2017, vs. 1.5% in 2016 and 2.9% in 2015. Real GDP grew at a quarterly annualized rate of 2.2% in Q1 2018, 4.2% in Q2 2018, 3.4% in Q3 2018 and 2.2% in Q4 2018; the Q2 rate was the best growth rate since Q3 2014, and the overall yearly GDP growth of 2.9% in 2018 was the best performance of the economy in a decade. In 2020, the growth rate of the GDP has started to drop as a result of the COVID-19 pandemic, resulting in the GDP shrinking at a quarterized annual growth rate of −5.0% in Q1 2020 and −32.9% in Q2 2020, respectively.

As of 2014, China passed the U.S. as the largest economy in GDP terms, measured at purchasing power parity conversion rates. The U.S. was the largest economy for more than a century prior to that milestone; China has more than tripled the U.S. growth rate for each of the past 40 years. As of 2017, the European Union as an aggregate had a GDP roughly 5% larger than the U.S.

Real GDP per capita (measured in 2009 dollars) was $52,444 in 2017 and has been growing each year since 2010. It grew 3.0% per year on average in the 1960s, 2.1% in the 1970s, 2.4% in the 1980s, 2.2% in the 1990s, 0.7% in the 2000s, and 0.9% from 2010 to 2017. Reasons for slower growth since 2000 are debated by economists and may include aging demographics, slower population and growth in labor force, slower productivity growth, reduced corporate investment, greater income inequality reducing demand, lack of major innovations, and reduced labor power. The U.S. ranked 20th out of 220 countries in GDP per capita in 2017. Among the modern U.S. Presidents, Bill Clinton had the highest cumulative percent real GDP increase during his two terms, Reagan second and Obama third.

The development of the nation's GDP according to World Bank: U.S. real GDP grew by an average of 1.7% from 2000 to the first half of 2014, a rate around half the historical average up to 2000.

By economic sector

Nominal GDP sector composition

Nominal GDP sector composition, 2015 (in millions of dollars) at 2005 constant prices

Nominal GDP Sector Composition, 2016 (in millions of dollars) at current prices.

Employment

There were approximately 160.4 million people in the U.S. labor force in 2017, the fourth largest labor force in the world behind China, India, and the European Union.
The government (federal, state and local) employed 22 million in 2010. Small businesses are the nation's largest employer, representing 37% of American workers. The second-largest share of employment belongs to large businesses employing 36% of the U.S. workforce.  White collar workers comprise 44% of the workforce as of 2022, up from 34% in 2000.

The nation's private sector employs 85% of working Americans. Government accounts for 14% of all U.S. workers. Over 99% of all private employing organizations in the U.S. are small businesses. The 30 million small businesses in the U.S. account for 64% of newly created jobs (those created minus those lost). Jobs in small businesses accounted for 70% of those created in the last decade.

The proportion of Americans employed by small business versus large business has remained relatively the same year by year as some small businesses become large businesses and just over half of small businesses survive for more than five years. Amongst large businesses, several of the largest companies and employers in the world are American companies. Amongst them are Walmart, which is both the largest company and the largest private sector employer in the world. Walmart employs 2.1 million people worldwide and 1.4 million in the U.S. alone.

There are nearly thirty million small businesses in the U.S.. Minorities such as Hispanics, African Americans, Asian Americans, and Native Americans (35% of the country's population), own 4.1 million of the nation's businesses. Minority-owned businesses generate almost $700billion in revenue, and they employ almost five million workers in the U.S.
Americans have the highest average employee income among OECD nations. The median household income in the U.S. as of 2008 is $52,029. About 284,000 working people in the U.S. have two full-time jobs and 7.6 million have part-time ones in addition to their full-time employments. Out of all working individuals in the U.S., 12% belong to a labor union and most union members work for the government. The decline of union membership in the U.S. over the last several decades parallels that of labor's share of the economy. The World Bank ranks the United States first in the ease of hiring and firing workers. The United States is the only advanced economy that does not legally guarantee its workers paid vacation or paid sick days, and is one of just a few countries in the world without paid family leave as a legal right, with the others being Papua New Guinea, Suriname and Liberia. In 2014 and again in 2020, the International Trade Union Confederation graded the U.S. a 4out of5+, its third-lowest score, on the subject of powers and rights granted to labor unions. Some scholars, including business theorist Jeffrey Pfeffer and political scientist Daniel Kinderman, posit that contemporary employment practices in the United States relating to the increased performance pressure from management, and the hardships imposed on employees such as toxic working environments, precarity, and long hours, could be responsible for 120,000 excess deaths annually, making the workplace the fifth leading cause of death in the United States.

Unemployment

As of December 2017, the unemployment rate in the U.S. was 4.1% or 6.6 million people. The government's broader U-6 unemployment rate, which includes the part-time underemployed, was 8.1% or 8.2 million people. These figures were calculated with a civilian labor force of approximately 160.6 million people, relative to a U.S. population of approximately 327 million people.

Between 2009 and 2010, following the Great Recession, the emerging problem of jobless recoveries resulted in record levels of long-term unemployment with more than six million workers looking for work for more than six months as of January 2010. This particularly affected older workers. A year after the recession ended in June 2009, immigrants gained 656,000 jobs in the U.S., while U.S.-born workers lost more than a million jobs, due in part to an aging country (relatively more white retirees) and demographic shifts. In April 2010, the official unemployment rate was 9.9%, but the government's broader U-6 unemployment rate was 17.1%. Between February 2008 and February 2010, the number of people working part-time for economic reasons (i.e., would prefer to work full-time) increased by 4.0 million to 8.8 million, an 83% increase in part-time workers during the two-year period.

By 2013, although the unemployment rate had fallen below 8%, the record proportion of long term unemployed and continued decreasing household income remained indicative of a jobless recovery. However, the number of payroll jobs returned to its pre-recession (November 2007) level by May 2014 as the economy recovered.

After being higher in the post-war period, the U.S. unemployment rate fell below the rising eurozone unemployment rate in the mid-1980s and has remained significantly lower almost continuously since. In 1955, 55% of Americans worked in services, between 30% and 35% in industry, and between 10% and 15% in agriculture. By 1980, over 65% were employed in services, between 25% and 30% in industry, and less than 5% in agriculture. Male unemployment continued to be significantly higher than those of females (at 9.8% vs. 7.5% in 2009). The unemployment among Caucasians continues being much lower than those for African-Americans (at 8.5% vs. 15.8% also in 2009).

The youth unemployment rate was 18.5% in July 2009, the highest rate in that month since 1948. The unemployment rate of young African Americans was 28.2% in May 2013.

The unemployment rate reached an all-time high of 14.7% in April 2020 before falling back to 11.1% in June 2020. Due to the effects of the COVID-19 pandemic, Q2 GDP in the US fell 32.9% in 2020. The unemployment rate continued its rapid decline falling to 3.9% in 2021.

Employment by sector

U.S. employment, as estimated in 2012, is divided into 79.7% in the service sector, 19.2% in the manufacturing sector, and 1.1% in the agriculture sector.

United States non-farm employment by industry sector February 2013.

Income and wealth

Income measures
Real (i.e., inflation-adjusted) median household income, a good measure of middle-class income, was $59,039 in 2016, a record level. However, it was just above the previous record set in 1998, indicating the purchasing power of middle-class family income has been stagnant or down for much of the past twenty years. During 2013, employee compensation was $8.969trillion, while gross private investment totals $2.781trillion.

Americans have the highest average household income among OECD nations, and in 2010 had the fourth-highest median household income, down from second-highest in 2007. According to one analysis middle-class incomes in the United States fell into a tie with those in Canada in 2010, and may have fallen behind by 2014, while several other advanced economies have closed the gap in recent years.

Income inequality
Income inequality has become a hotly debated topic globally. According to the CIA World Factbook, U.S. income inequality ranked 41st highest among 156 countries in 2017 (i.e., 74% of countries have a more equal income distribution). According to the Congressional Budget Office, the top 1% of income households earned about a 9% share of the pre-tax income in 1979, versus 19% in 2007 and 17% in 2014. For after-tax income, these figures were 7%, 17%, and 13%, respectively. These figures indicate the share of income earned by top earners more than doubled between 1979 and 2007, then fell somewhat following the Great Recession, and the higher tax rates and re-distributive policies applied by President Barack Obama in 2013 (i.e., expiration of the Bush Tax Cuts for the top 1% and subsidies for lower income persons via the Affordable Care Act). Recasting the 2012 income using the 1979 income distribution (representing the more egalitarian 1950–1980 period), the bottom 99% of families would have averaged about $7,100 more income. Income inequality in the United States has grown from 2005 to 2012 in more than two out of three metropolitan areas.

The top 1 percent of income-earners accounted for 52 percent of the income gains from 2009 to 2015, where income is defined as market income excluding government transfers, while their share of total income has more than doubled from nine percent in 1976 to twenty percent in 2011. According to a 2014 OECD report, 80% of total pre-tax market income growth went to the top 10% from 1975 to 2007.

A number of economists and others have expressed growing concern about income inequality, calling it "deeply worrying", unjust, a danger to democracy/social stability, or a sign of national decline. Yale professor Robert Shiller has said, "The most important problem that we are facing now today, I think, is rising inequality in the United States and elsewhere in the world." Thomas Piketty of the Paris School of Economics argues that the post-1980 increase in inequality played a role in the 2008 crisis by contributing to the nation's financial instability. In 2016, the economists Peter H. Lindert and Jeffrey G. Williamson claimed that inequality is the highest it has been since the nation's founding. In 2018, income inequality was at the highest level ever recorded by the Census Bureau, with a Gini index of 0.485.

Others disagree, saying that the inequality issue is a political distraction from what they consider real problems like chronic unemployment and sluggish growth. George Mason University economics professor Tyler Cowen has called inequality a "red herring", saying that factors driving its increase within a nation can simultaneously be driving its reduction globally, and arguing that redistributive policies intended to reduce inequality can do more harm than good regarding the real problem of stagnant wages. Robert Lucas Jr. has argued that the salient problem American living standards face is a government that has grown too much, and that recent policy shifts in the direction of European-style taxation, welfare spending, and regulation may be indefinitely putting the U.S. on a significantly lower, European level income trajectory. Some researchers have disputed the accuracy of the underlying data regarding claims about inequality trends, and economists Michael Bordo and Christopher M. Meissner have argued that inequality cannot be blamed for the 2008 financial crisis.

According to a report by the Congressional Research Service, decreased progressiveness in capital gains taxes was the largest contributor to the increase in overall income inequality in the U.S. from 1996 to 2006.

As of 2010 The U.S. had the fourth-widest income distribution among OECD nations, behind Turkey, Mexico, and Chile. The Brookings Institution said in March 2013 that income inequality was increasing and becoming permanent, sharply reducing social mobility in the US. The OECD ranks the U.S. 10th in social mobility, behind the Nordic countries, Australia, Canada, Germany, Spain, and France. Of the major developed nations, only Italy and Great Britain have lower mobility. This has been partly attributed to the depth of American poverty, which leaves poor children economically disadvantaged, though others have observed that a relative rise in the U.S. is mathematically harder due to its higher and more widely distributed income range than in nations with artificial income compression, even if one enjoys more absolute mobility in the U.S., and have questioned how meaningful such international comparisons are.

There has been a widening gap between productivity and median incomes since the 1970s. The primary cause for the gap between productivity and income growth is the decline in per capita hours worked. Other causes include the rise in non-cash benefits as a share of worker compensation (which aren't counted in CPS income data), immigrants entering the labor force, statistical distortions including the use of different inflation adjusters by the BLS and CPS, productivity gains being skewed toward less labor-intensive sectors, income shifting from labor to capital, a skill gap-driven wage disparity, productivity being falsely inflated by hidden technology-driven depreciation increases and import price measurement problems, and/or a natural period of adjustment following an income surge during aberrational post-war circumstances.

According to a 2018 study by the OECD, given that the unemployed and at-risk workers get almost no government support and are further set back by a very weak collective bargaining system, the U.S. has much higher income inequality and a larger percentage of low-income workers than almost any other developed nation.

Household net worth and wealth inequality

As of Q4 2017, total household net worth in the United States was a record $99trillion, an increase of $5.2trillion from 2016. This increase reflects both stock market and housing price gains. This measure has been setting records since Q4 2012. If divided evenly, the $99trillion represents an average of $782,000 per household (for about 126.2 million households) or $302,000 per person. However, median household net worth (i.e., half of the families above and below this level) was $97,300 in 2016. The bottom 25% of families had a median net worth of zero, while the 25th to 50th percentile had a median net worth of $40,000.

Wealth inequality is more unequal than income inequality, with the top 1% households owning approximately 42% of the net worth in 2012, versus 24% in 1979. According to a September 2017 report by the Federal Reserve, wealth inequality is at record highs; the top 1% controlled 38.6% of the country's wealth in 2016. The Boston Consulting Group posited in June 2017 report that 1% of the Americans will control 70% of country's wealth by 2021.

The top 10% wealthiest possess 80% of all financial assets. Wealth inequality in the U.S. is greater than in most developed countries other than Sweden. Inherited wealth may help explain why many Americans who have become rich may have had a "substantial head start". In September 2012, according to the Institute for Policy Studies, "over 60 percent" of the Forbes richest 400 Americans "grew up in substantial privilege". Median household wealth fell 35% in the U.S., from $106,591 to $68,839 between 2005 and 2011, due to the Great Recession, but has since recovered as indicated above.

About 30% of the entire world's millionaire population resides in the United States. The Economist Intelligence Unit estimated in 2008 that there were 16,600,000 millionaires in the U.S. Furthermore, 34% of the world's billionaires are American (in 2011).

Home ownership

The U.S. home ownership rate in Q1 2018 was 64.2%, well below the all-time peak of 69.2% set in Q4 2004 during a housing bubble. Millions of homes were lost to foreclosure during the Great Recession of 2007–2009, bringing the ownership rate to a trough of 62.9% in Q2 2016. The average ownership rate from 1965 to 2017 was 65.3%.

The average home in the United States has more than 700 square feet per person (65 square meters), which is 50%–100% more than the average in other high-income countries. Similarly, ownership rates of gadgets and amenities are relatively high compared to other countries.

It was reported by Pew Research Center in 2016 that, for the first time in 130 years, Americans aged 18 to 34 are more likely to live with their parents than in any other housing situation.

In one study by ATTOM Data Solutions, in 70% of the counties surveyed, homes are increasingly unaffordable for the average U.S. worker.

As of 2018, the number of U.S. citizens residing in their vehicles because they can't find affordable housing has "exploded", particularly in cities with steep increases in the cost of housing such as Los Angeles, Portland and San Francisco.

Profits and wages

Real wages (wages adjusted for inflation) for most workers in the United States and median incomes have either declined or remained stagnant for the last twenty to forty years. A 2020 microanalysis demonstrated that in the preceding four decades labor's share of national output declined while over the same period the profit share of the same output increased.

In 1970, wages represented more than 51% of the U.S. GDP and profits were less than 5%. But by 2013, wages had fallen to 44% of the economy, while profits had more than doubled to 11%. Inflation-adjusted ("real") per capita disposable personal income rose steadily in the U.S. from 1945 to 2008, but has since remained generally level.

In 2005, median personal income for those over the age of 18 ranged from $3,317 for an unemployed, married Asian American female to $55,935 for a full-time, year-round employed Asian American male. According to the U.S. Census men tended to have higher income than women while Asians and Whites earned more than African Americans and Hispanics. The overall median personal income for all individuals over the age of 18 was $24,062 ($32,140 for those age 25 or above) in the year 2005.

As a reference point, the minimum wage rate in 2009 and 2017 was $7.25 per hour or $15,080 for the 2080 hours in a typical work year. The minimum wage is a little more than the poverty level for a single person unit and about 50% of the poverty level for a family of four.

According to an October 2014 report by the Pew Research Center, real wages have been flat or falling for the last five decades for most U.S. workers, regardless of job growth. Bloomberg reported in July 2018 that real GDP per capita has grown substantially since the Great Recession, but real compensation per hour, including benefits, hasn't increased at all.

An August 2017 survey by CareerBuilder found that eight out of ten U.S. workers live paycheck to paycheck. CareerBuilder spokesman Mike Erwin blamed "stagnant wages and the rising cost of everything from education to many consumer goods". According to a survey by the federal Consumer Financial Protection Bureau on the financial well-being of U.S. citizens, roughly half have trouble paying bills, and more than one third have faced hardships such as not being able to afford a place to live, running out of food, or not having enough money to pay for medical care. According to journalist and author Alissa Quart, the cost of living is rapidly outpacing the growth of salaries and wages, including those for traditionally secure professions such as teaching. She writes that "middle-class life is now 30% more expensive than it was 20 years ago."

In February 2019, the Federal Reserve Bank of New York reported that seven million U.S. citizens are three months or more behind on their car payments, setting a record. This is considered a red flag by economists, that Americans are struggling to pay bills in spite of a low unemployment rate. A May 2019 poll conducted by NPR found that among rural Americans, 40% struggle to pay for healthcare, food and housing, and 49% could not pay cash for a $1,000 emergency, and would instead choose to borrow in order to pay for such an unexpected emergency expense. Some experts assert that the US has experienced a "two-tier recovery", which has benefitted 60% of the population, while the other 40% on the "lower tier" have been struggling to pay bills as the result of stagnant wages, increases in the cost of housing, education and healthcare, and growing debts.

A 2021 study by the National Low Income Housing Coalition found that workers would have to make at least $24.90 an hour to be able to afford (meaning 30% of a person's income or less) renting a standard two-bedroom home or $20.40 for a one-bedroom home anywhere in the US. The former is 3.4 times higher than the current federal minimum wage.

Poverty

Starting in the 1980s relative poverty rates have consistently exceeded those of other wealthy nations, though analyses using a common data set for comparisons tend to find that the U.S. has a lower absolute poverty rate by market income than most other wealthy nations. Extreme poverty in the United States, meaning households living on less than $2 per day before government benefits, doubled from 1996 levels to 1.5 million households in 2011, including 2.8 million children. In 2013, child poverty reached record high levels, with 16.7 million children living in food insecure households, about 35% more than 2007 levels. As of 2015, 44 percent of children in the United States live with low-income families.

In 2016, 12.7% of the U.S. population lived in poverty, down from 13.5% in 2015. The poverty rate rose from 12.5% in 2007 before the Great Recession to a 15.1% peak in 2010, before falling back to just above the 2007 level. In the 1959–1962 period, the poverty rate was over 20%, but declined to the all-time low of 11.1% in 1973 following the War on Poverty begun during the Lyndon Johnson presidency. In June 2016, The IMF warned the United States that its high poverty rate needs to be tackled urgently.

The population in extreme-poverty neighborhoods rose by one third from 2000 to 2009. People living in such neighborhoods tend to suffer from inadequate access to quality education; higher crime rates; higher rates of physical and psychological ailment; limited access to credit and wealth accumulation; higher prices for goods and services; and constrained access to job opportunities. As of 2013, 44% of America's poor are considered to be in "deep poverty", with an income 50% or more below the government's official poverty line.

According to the US Department of Housing and Urban Development's Annual Homeless Assessment Report,  there were around 554,000 homeless people in the United States on a given night, or 0.17% of the population. Almost two thirds stayed in an emergency shelter or transitional housing program and the other third were living on the street, in an abandoned building, or another place not meant for human habitation. About 1.56 million people, or about 0.5% of the U.S. population, used an emergency shelter or a transitional housing program between October 1, 2008, and September 30, 2009. Around 44% of homeless people are employed.

The United States has one of the least extensive social safety nets in the developed world, reducing both relative poverty and absolute poverty by considerably less than the mean for wealthy nations. Some experts posit that those in poverty live in conditions rivaling the developing world. A May 2018 report by the U.N. Special Rapporteur on extreme poverty and human rights found that over five million people in the United States live "in 'Third World' conditions". Over the last three decades the poor in America have been incarcerated at a much higher rate than their counterparts in other developed nations, with penal confinement being "commonplace for poor men of working age". Some scholars contend that the shift to neoliberal social and economic policies starting in the late 1970s has expanded the penal state, retrenched the social welfare state, deregulated the economy and criminalized poverty, ultimately "transforming what it means to be poor in America".

Health care

Coverage

The American system is a mix of public and private insurance. The government provides insurance coverage for approximately 53 million elderly via Medicare, 62 million lower-income persons via Medicaid, and 15 million military veterans via the Veteran's Administration. About 178 million employed by companies receive subsidized health insurance through their employer, while 52 million other persons directly purchase insurance either via the subsidized marketplace exchanges developed as part of the Affordable Care Act or directly from insurers. The private sector delivers healthcare services, with the exception of the Veteran's Administration, where doctors are employed by the government.

Multiple surveys indicate the number of uninsured fell between 2013 and 2016 due to expanded Medicaid eligibility and health insurance exchanges established due to the Patient Protection and Affordable Care Act, also known as the "ACA" or "Obamacare". According to the United States Census Bureau, in 2012 there were 45.6 million people in the US (14.8% of the under-65 population) who were without health insurance. This figure fell by 18.3 million (40%) to 27.3 million (8.6% of the under-65 population) by 2016.

However, under President Trump these gains in healthcare coverage have begun to reverse. The Commonwealth Fund estimated in May 2018 that the number of uninsured increased by four million from early 2016 to early 2018. The rate of those uninsured increased from 12.7% in 2016 to 15.5%. The impact was greater among lower-income adults, who had a higher uninsured rate than higher-income adults. Regionally, the South and West had higher uninsured rates than the North and East. Further, those 18 states that have not expanded Medicaid had a higher uninsured rate than those that did.

According to Physicians for a National Health Program, this lack of insurance causes roughly 48,000 unnecessary deaths per year. The group's methodology has been criticized by John C. Goodman for not looking at cause of death or tracking insurance status changes over time, including the time of death. A 2009 study by former Clinton policy adviser Richard Kronick found no increased mortality from being uninsured after certain risk factors were controlled for.

Outcomes
The U.S. lags in overall healthcare performance but is a global leader in medical innovation. America solely developed or contributed significantly to nine of the top ten most important medical innovations since 1975 as ranked by a 2001 poll of physicians, while the EU and Switzerland together contributed to five. Since 1966, Americans have received more Nobel Prizes in Medicine than the rest of the world combined. From 1989 to 2002, four times more money was invested in private biotechnology companies in America than in Europe.

Of 17 high-income countries studied by the National Institutes of Health in 2013, the United States ranked at or near the top in obesity rate, frequency of automobile use and accidents, homicides, infant mortality rate, incidence of heart and lung disease, sexually transmitted infections, adolescent pregnancies, recreational drug or alcohol deaths, injuries, and rates of disability. Together, such lifestyle and societal factors place the U.S. at the bottom of that list for life expectancy. On average, a U.S. male can be expected to live almost four fewer years than those in the top-ranked country, though Americans who reach age 75 live longer than those who reach that age in peer nations. One consumption choice causing several of the maladies described above are cigarettes. Americans smoked 258 billion cigarettes in 2016. Cigarettes cost the United States $326billion each year in direct healthcare costs ($170billion) and lost productivity ($156billion).

A comprehensive 2007 study by European doctors found the five-year cancer survival rate was significantly higher in the U.S. than in all 21 European nations studied, 66.3% for men versus the European mean of 47.3% and 62.9% versus 52.8% for women. Americans undergo cancer screenings at significantly higher rates than people in other developed countries, and access MRI and CT scans at the highest rate of any OECD nation. People in the U.S. diagnosed with high cholesterol or hypertension access pharmaceutical treatments at higher rates than those diagnosed in other developed nations, and are more likely to successfully control the conditions. Diabetics are more likely to receive treatment and meet treatment targets in the U.S. than in Canada, England, or Scotland.

According to a 2018 study of 2016 data by the Institute for Health Metrics and Evaluation, the U.S. was ranked 27th in the world for healthcare and education, down from 6th in 1990.

Cost

U.S. healthcare costs are considerably higher than other countries as a share of GDP, among other measures. According to the OECD, U.S. healthcare costs in 2015 were 16.9% GDP, over 5% GDP higher than the next most expensive OECD country. A gap of 5% GDP represents $1trillion, about $3,000 per person or one-third higher relative to the next most expensive country.

The high cost of health care in the United States is attributed variously to technological advance, administration costs, drug pricing, suppliers charging more for medical equipment, the receiving of more medical care than people in other countries, the high wages of doctors, government regulations, the impact of lawsuits, and third party payment systems insulating consumers from the full cost of treatments. The lowest prices for pharmaceuticals, medical devices, and payments to physicians are in government plans. Americans tend to receive more medical care than people do in other countries, which is a notable contributor to higher costs. In the United States, a person is more likely to receive open heart surgery after a heart attack than in other countries. Medicaid pays less than Medicare for many prescription drugs due to the fact Medicaid discounts are set by law, whereas Medicare prices are negotiated by private insurers and drug companies. Government plans often pay less than overhead, resulting in healthcare providers shifting the cost to the privately insured through higher prices.

Composition of economic sectors

The United States is the world's second-largest manufacturer, with a 2013 industrial output of US$2.4trillion. Its manufacturing output is greater than of Germany, France, India, and Brazil combined.
Its main industries include financials, information technology, petroleum, steel, automobiles, construction machinery, aerospace, agricultural machinery, telecommunications, chemicals, electronics, food processing, consumer goods, lumber, mining and armaments.

The U.S. leads the world in airplane manufacturing, which represents a large portion of U.S. industrial output. American companies such as Boeing, Cessna (see: Textron), Lockheed Martin (see: Skunk Works), and General Dynamics produce a majority of the world's civilian and military aircraft in factories across the United States.

The manufacturing sector of the U.S. economy has experienced substantial job losses over the past several years. In January 2004, the number of such jobs stood at 14.3 million, down by 3.0 million jobs (17.5%) since July 2000 and about 5.2 million since the historical peak in 1979. Employment in manufacturing was its lowest since July 1950. The number of steel workers fell from 500,000 in 1980 to 224,000 in 2000.

The U.S. produces approximately 18% of the world's manufacturing output, a share that has declined as other nations developed competitive manufacturing industries. The job loss during this continual volume growth is the result of multiple factors including increased productivity, trade, and secular economic trends. In addition, growth in telecommunications, pharmaceuticals, aircraft, heavy machinery and other industries along with declines in low end, low skill industries such as clothing, toys, and other simple manufacturing have resulted in some U.S. jobs being more highly skilled and better paying. There has been much debate within the United States on whether the decline in manufacturing jobs are related to American unions, lower foreign wages, or both.

Products include wheat, corn, other grains, fruits, vegetables, cotton; beef, pork, poultry, dairy products, forest products, and fish.

Energy, transportation, and telecommunications

Transportation

Road
The U.S. economy is heavily dependent on road transport for moving people and goods. Personal transportation is dominated by automobiles, which operate on a network of four million miles (6.4 million km) of public roads, including one of the world's longest highway systems at 57,000 miles (91,700km). The world's second-largest automobile market, the United States has the highest rate of per-capita vehicle ownership in the world, with 765 vehicles per 1,000 Americans. About 40% of personal vehicles are vans, SUVs, or light trucks.

Rail
Mass transit accounts for 9% of total U.S. work trips. Transport of goods by rail is extensive, though relatively low numbers of passengers (approximately 31 million annually) use intercity rail to travel, partially due to the low population density throughout much of the nation. However, ridership on Amtrak, the national intercity passenger rail system, grew by almost 37% between 2000 and 2010. Also, light rail development has increased in recent years. The state of California is currently constructing the nation's first high-speed rail system.

Airline
The civil airline industry is entirely privately owned and has been largely deregulated since 1978, while most major airports are publicly owned. The three largest airlines in the world by passengers carried are U.S.-based; American Airlines is number one after its 2013 acquisition by U.S. Airways. Of the world's thirty busiest passenger airports, twelve are in the United States, including the busiest, Hartsfield–Jackson Atlanta International Airport.

Energy

The US is the second-largest energy consumer in total use. The U.S. ranks seventh in energy consumption per capita after Canada and a number of other countries. The majority of this energy is derived from fossil fuels: in 2005, it was estimated that 40% of the nation's energy came from petroleum, 23% from coal, and 23% from natural gas. Nuclear power supplied 8.4% and renewable energy supplied 6.8%, which was mainly from hydroelectric dams although other renewables are included.

American dependence on oil imports grew from 24% in 1970 to 65% by the end of 2005. Transportation has the highest consumption rates, accounting for approximately 69% of the oil used in the United States in 2006, and 55% of oil use worldwide as documented in the Hirsch report.

In 2013, the United States imported 2.808 billion barrels of crude oil, compared to 3.377 billion barrels in 2010. While the U.S. is the largest importer of fuel, The Wall Street Journal reported in 2011 that the country was about to become a net fuel exporter for the first time in 62 years. The paper reported expectations that this would continue until 2020. In fact, petroleum was the major export from the country in 2011.

Telecommunications

The Internet was developed in the U.S. and the country hosts many of the world's largest hubs.

International trade

The United States is the world's second-largest trading nation. There is a large amount of U.S. dollars in circulation all around the planet; about 60% of funds used in international trade are U.S. dollars. The dollar is also used as the standard unit of currency in international markets for commodities such as gold and petroleum.

The North American Free Trade Agreement, or NAFTA, created one of the largest trade blocs in the world in 1994.

Since 1976, the U.S. has sustained merchandise trade deficits with other nations, and since 1982, current account deficits. The nation's long-standing surplus in its trade in services was maintained, however, and reached a record US$231billion in 2013.

The U.S. trade deficit increased from $502billion in 2016 to $552billion in 2017, an increase of $50billion or 10%. During 2017, total imports were $2.90trillion, while exports were $2.35trillion. The net deficit in goods was $807billion, while the net surplus in services was $255billion.

Americas ten largest trading partners are China, Canada, Mexico, Japan, Germany, South Korea, United Kingdom, France, India and Taiwan. The goods trade deficit with China rose from $347billion in 2016 to $376billion in 2017, an increase of $30billion or 8%. In 2017, the U.S. had a goods trade deficit of $71billion with Mexico and $17billion with Canada.

According to the KOF index of globalization and the globalization index by A.T. Kearney/Foreign Policy Magazine, the U.S. has a relatively high degree of globalization. U.S. workers send a third of all remittances in the world.

Financial position

U.S. household and non-profit net worth exceeded $100trillion for the first time in Q1 2018; it has been setting records since Q4 2012. The U.S. federal government or "national debt" was $21.1trillion in May 2018, just over 100% GDP. Using a subset of the national debt called "debt held by the public", U.S. debt was approximately 77% GDP in 2017. By this measure, the U.S. ranked 43rd highest among 2017 nations. Debt held by the public rose considerably as a result of the Great Recession and its aftermath. It is expected to continue rising as the country ages towards 100% GDP by 2028.

The U.S. public debt was $909billion in 1980, an amount equal to 33% of America's gross domestic product (GDP); by 1990, that number had more than tripled to $3.2trillion56% of GDP. In 2001 the national debt was $5.7trillion; however, the debt-to-GDP ratio remained at 1990 levels. Debt levels rose quickly in the following decade, and on January 28, 2010, the U.S. debt ceiling was raised to $14.3trillion. Based on the 2010 United States federal budget, total national debt will grow to nearly 100% of GDP, versus a level of approximately 80% in early 2009. The White House estimates that the government's tab for servicing the debt will exceed $700billion a year in 2019, up from $202billion in 2009.

The U.S. Treasury statistics indicate that, at the end of 2006, non-US citizens and institutions held 44% of federal debt held by the public. , China, holding $1.26trillion in treasury bonds, is the largest foreign financier of the U.S. public debt.

The overall financial position of the United States as of 2014 includes $269.6trillion of assets owned by households, businesses, and governments within its borders, representing more than 15.7 times the annual gross domestic product of the United States. Debts owed during this same period amounted to $145.8trillion, about 8.5 times the annual gross domestic product.

Since 2010, the U.S. Treasury has been obtaining negative real interest rates on government debt. Such low rates, outpaced by the inflation rate, occur when the market believes that there are no alternatives with sufficiently low risk, or when popular institutional investments such as insurance companies, pensions, or bond, money market, and balanced mutual funds are required or choose to invest sufficiently large sums in Treasury securities to hedge against risk. American economist Lawrence Summers argues that at such low rates, government debt borrowing saves taxpayer money, and improves creditworthiness.

In the late 1940s through the early 1970s, the US and UK both reduced their debt burden by about 30% to 40% of GDP per decade by taking advantage of negative real interest rates, but there is no guarantee that government debt rates will continue to stay so low. In January 2012, the U.S. Treasury Borrowing Advisory Committee of the Securities Industry and Financial Markets Association unanimously recommended that government debt be allowed to auction even lower, at negative absolute interest rates.

Currency and central bank

The United States dollar is the unit of currency of the United States. The U.S. dollar is the currency most used in international transactions. Several countries use it as their official currency, and in many others it is the de facto currency.

The federal government attempts to use both monetary policy (control of the money supply through mechanisms such as changes in interest rates) and fiscal policy (taxes and spending) to maintain low inflation, high economic growth, and low unemployment. A private central bank, known as the Federal Reserve, was formed in 1913 to provide a stable currency and monetary policy. The U.S. dollar has been regarded as one of the more stable currencies in the world and many nations back their own currency with U.S. dollar reserves.

The U.S. dollar has maintained its position as the world's primary reserve currency, although it is gradually being challenged in that role. Almost two thirds of currency reserves held around the world are held in U.S. dollars, compared to around 25% for the next most popular currency, the euro. Rising U.S. national debt and quantitative easing has caused some to predict that the U.S. dollar will lose its status as the world's reserve currency; however, these predictions have not yet come to fruition.

Corruption

In 2019, the United States was ranked 23rd on the Transparency International Corruption Perceptions Index with a score of 69 out of 100.
This is a decrease from its score in 2018 which was 71 out of 100.

Law and government
The United States ranked 4th in the ease of doing business index in 2012, 18th in the Economic Freedom of the World index by the Fraser Institute in 2012, 10th in the Index of Economic Freedom by The Wall Street Journal and The Heritage Foundation in 2012, 15th in the 2014 Global Enabling Trade Report, and 3rd on the Global Competitiveness Report.

According to the 2014 Index of Economic Freedom, released by The Wall Street Journal and The Heritage Foundation, the U.S. has dropped out of the top ten most economically free countries. The U.S. has been on a steady seven-year economic freedom decline and is the only country to do so. The index measures each nation's commitment to free enterprise on a scale of 0 to 100. Countries losing economic freedom and receiving low index scores are at risk of economic stagnation, high unemployment rates, and diminishing social conditions. The 2014 Index of Economic Freedom gave the United States a score of 75.5 and is listed as the twelfth-freest economy in world. It dropped two rankings and its score is half a point lower than in 2013.

Regulations

The U.S. federal government regulates private enterprise in numerous ways. Regulation falls into two general categories.

Some efforts seek, either directly or indirectly, to control prices. Traditionally, the government has sought to create state-regulated monopolies such as electric utilities while allowing prices in the level that would ensure them normal profits. At times, the government has extended economic control to other kinds of industries as well. In the years following the Great Depression, it devised a complex system to stabilize prices for agricultural goods, which tend to fluctuate wildly in response to rapidly changing supply and demand. A number of other industries—trucking and, later, airlines—successfully sought regulation themselves to limit what they considered as harmful price-cutting, a process called regulatory capture.

Another form of economic regulation, antitrust law, seeks to strengthen market forces so that direct regulation is unnecessary. The government—and, sometimes, private parties—have used antitrust law to prohibit practices or mergers that would unduly limit competition.

Bank regulation in the United States is highly fragmented compared to other G10 countries where most countries have only one bank regulator. In the U.S., banking is regulated at both the federal and state level. The U.S. also has one of the most highly regulated banking environments in the world; however, many of the regulations are not soundness related, but are instead focused on privacy, disclosure, fraud prevention, anti-money laundering, anti-terrorism, anti-usury lending, and promoting lending to lower-income segments.

Since the 1970s, government has also exercised control over private companies to achieve social goals, such as improving the public's health and safety or maintaining a healthy environment. For example, the Occupational Safety and Health Administration provides and enforces standards for workplace safety, and the United States Environmental Protection Agency provides standards and regulations to maintain air, water, and land resources. The U.S. Food and Drug Administration regulates what drugs may reach the market, and also provides standards of disclosure for food products.

American attitudes about regulation changed substantially during the final three decades of the 20th century. Beginning in the 1970s, policy makers grew increasingly convinced that economic regulation protected companies at the expense of consumers in industries such as airlines and trucking. At the same time, technological changes spawned new competitors in some industries, such as telecommunications, that once were considered natural monopolies. Both developments led to a succession of laws easing regulation.

While leaders of America's two most influential political parties generally favored economic deregulation during the 1970s, 1980s, and 1990s, there was less agreement concerning regulations designed to achieve social goals. Social regulation had assumed growing importance in the years following the Depression and World War II, and again in the 1960s and 1970s. During the 1980s, the government relaxed labor, consumer and environmental rules based on the idea that such regulation interfered with free enterprise, increased the costs of doing business, and thus contributed to inflation. The response to such changes is mixed; many Americans continued to voice concerns about specific events or trends, prompting the government to issue new regulations in some areas, including environmental protection.

Where legislative channels have been unresponsive, some citizens have turned to the courts to address social issues more quickly. For instance, in the 1990s, individuals, and eventually the government itself, sued tobacco companies over the health risks of cigarette smoking. The 1998 Tobacco Master Settlement Agreement provided states with long-term payments to cover medical costs to treat smoking-related illnesses.

Between 2000 and 2008, economic regulation in the United States saw the most rapid expansion since the early 1970s. The number of new pages in the Federal Registry, a proxy for economic regulation, rose from 64,438 new pages in 2001 to 78,090 in new pages in 2007, a record amount of regulation. Economically significant regulations, defined as regulations which cost more than $100million a year, increased by 70%. Spending on regulation increased by 62% from $26.4billion to $42.7billion.

Taxation

Taxation in the United States is a complex system which may involve payment to at least four different levels of government and many methods of taxation. Taxes are levied by the federal government, by the state governments, and often by local governments, which may include counties, municipalities, township, school districts, and other special-purpose districts, which include fire, utility, and transit districts.

Forms of taxation include taxes on income, property, sales, imports, payroll, estates and gifts, as well as various fees. When taxation by all government levels taken into consideration, the total taxation as percentage of GDP was approximately a quarter of GDP in 2011. Share of black market in the U.S. economy is very low compared to other countries.

Although a federal wealth tax is prohibited by the United States Constitution unless the receipts are distributed to the States by their populations, state and local government property tax amount to a wealth tax on real estate, and because capital gains are taxed on nominal instead of inflation-adjusted profits, the capital gains tax amounts to a wealth tax on the inflation rate.

U.S. taxation is generally progressive, especially at the federal level, and is among the most progressive in the developed world. There is debate over whether taxes should be more or less progressive.

According to the Tax Justice Network in 2022, the US fuels more global financial secrecy than Switzerland, Cayman and Bermuda combined.

Expenditure

The United States public-sector spending amounts to about 38% of GDP (federal is around 21%, state and local the remainder). Each level of government provides many direct services. The federal government, for example, is responsible for national defense, research that often leads to the development of new products, conducts space exploration, and runs numerous programs designed to help workers develop workplace skills and find jobs (including higher education). Government spending has a significant effect on local and regional economies, and on the overall pace of economic activity.

State governments, meanwhile, are responsible for the construction and maintenance of most highways. State, county, or city governments play the leading role in financing and operating public schools. Local governments are primarily responsible for police and fire protection. In 2016, U.S. state and local governments owed $3trillion and have another $5trillion in unfunded liabilities.

The welfare system in the United States began in the 1930s, during the Great Depression, with the passage of the New Deal. The welfare system was later expanded in the 1960s through Great Society legislation, which included Medicare, Medicaid, the Older Americans Act and federal education funding.

Overall, federal, state, and local spending accounted for almost 28% of gross domestic product in 1998.

Federal budget and debt

During FY2017, the federal government spent $3.98trillion on a budget or cash basis, up $128billion or 3.3% vs. FY2016 spending of $3.85trillion. Major categories of FY 2017 spending included: Healthcare such as Medicare and Medicaid ($1,077B or 27% of spending), Social Security ($939B or 24%), non-defense discretionary spending used to run federal Departments and Agencies ($610B or 15%), Defense Department ($590B or 15%), and interest ($263B or 7%).

During FY2017, the federal government collected approximately $3.32trillion in tax revenue, up $48billion or 1.5% versus FY2016. Primary receipt categories included individual income taxes ($1,587billion or 48% of total receipts), Social Security/Social Insurance taxes ($1,162billion or 35%), and corporate taxes ($297billion or 9%). Other revenue types included excise, estate and gift taxes. FY 2017 revenues were 17.3% of gross domestic product (GDP), versus 17.7% in FY 2016. Tax revenues averaged approximately 17.4% GDP over the 1980–2017 period.

The federal budget deficit (i.e., expenses greater than revenues) was $665billion in FY2017, versus $585billion in 2016, an increase of $80billion or 14%. The budget deficit was 3.5% GDP in 2017, versus 3.2% GDP in 2016. The budget deficit is forecast to rise to $804billion in FY 2018, due significantly to the Tax Cuts and Jobs Act and other spending bills. An aging country and healthcare inflation are other drivers of deficits and debt over the long-run.

Debt held by the public, a measure of national debt, was approximately $14.7trillion or 77% of GDP in 2017, ranked the 43rd highest out of 207 countries. This debt, as a percent of GDP, is roughly equivalent to those of many western European nations.

Business culture
A central feature of the U.S. economy is the economic freedom afforded to the private sector by allowing the private sector to make the majority of economic decisions in determining the direction and scale of what the U.S. economy produces. This is enhanced by relatively low levels of regulation and government involvement, as well as a court system that generally protects property rights and enforces contracts. Today, the United States is home to 29.6 million small businesses, thirty percent of the world's millionaires, forty percent of the world's billionaires, and 139 of the world's 500 largest companies.

From its emergence as an independent nation, the United States has encouraged science and innovation. In the early 20th century, the research developed through informal cooperation between U.S. industry and academia grew rapidly and by the late 1930s exceeded the size of that taking place in Britain (although the quality of U.S. research was not yet on par with British and German research at the time). After World War II, federal spending on defense R&D and antitrust policy played a significant role in U.S. innovation.

The United States is rich in mineral resources and fertile farm soil, and it is fortunate to have a moderate climate. It also has extensive coastlines on both the Atlantic and Pacific Oceans, as well as on the Gulf of Mexico. Rivers flow from far within the continent and the Great Lakes (the five large inland lakes along the Canadian border) provide additional shipping access. These extensive waterways have helped shape the country's economic growth over the years and helped bind America's fifty individual states together in a single economic unit.

The number of workers and, more importantly, their productivity help determine the health of the U.S. economy. Consumer spending in the U.S. rose to about 62% of GDP in 1960, where it stayed until about 1981, and has since risen to 71% in 2013. Throughout its history, the United States has experienced steady growth in the labor force, a phenomenon that is both cause and effect of almost constant economic expansion. Until shortly after World War I, most workers were immigrants from Europe, their immediate descendants, or African Americans who were mostly slaves taken from Africa, or their descendants.

Demographic shift

Beginning in the late 20th century, many Latin Americans immigrated, followed by large numbers of Asians after the removal of nation-origin based immigration quotas. The promise of high wages brings many highly skilled workers from around the world to the United States, as well as millions of illegal immigrants seeking work in the informal economy. More than 13 million people officially entered the United States during the 1990s alone.

Labor mobility has also been important to the capacity of the American economy to adapt to changing conditions. When immigrants flooded labor markets on the East Coast, many workers moved inland, often to farmland waiting to be tilled. Similarly, economic opportunities in industrial, northern cities attracted black Americans from southern farms in the first half of the 20th century, in what was known as the Great Migration.

In the United States, the corporation has emerged as an association of owners, known as stockholders, who form a business enterprise governed by a complex set of rules and customs. Brought on by the process of mass production, corporations, such as General Electric, have been instrumental in shaping the United States. Through the stock market, American banks and investors have grown their economy by investing and withdrawing capital from profitable corporations. Today in the era of globalization, American investors and corporations have influence all over the world. The American government is also included among the major investors in the American economy. Government investments have been directed towards public works of scale (such as from the Hoover Dam), military-industrial contracts, and the financial industry.

Aging

The U.S. population is aging, which has significant economic implications for GDP growth, productivity, innovation, inequality, and national debt, according to several studies. The average worker in 2019 was aged 42, vs. 38 in 2000. By 2030, about 59% of adults over 16 will be in the labor force, vs. 62% in 2015. One study estimated that aging since 2000 has reduced productivity between 0.25% and 0.7% per year. Since GDP growth is a function of productivity (output per worker) and the number of workers, both trends slow the GDP growth rate. Older workers save more, which pushes interests rates down, offsetting some of the GDP growth reduction but reducing the Federal Reserve's ability to address a recession by lowering interest rates. Means of addressing the aging trend include immigration (which theoretically brings in younger workers) and higher fertility rates, which can be encouraged by incentives to have more children (e.g., tax breaks, subsidies, and more generous paid leave).

The Congressional Budget Office estimated in May 2019 that mandatory spending (e.g., Medicare, Medicaid, and Social Security) will continue growing relative to the size of the economy (GDP) as the population ages. The population aged 65 or older is projected to rise by one-third from 2019–2029. Mandatory program spending (outlays) in 2019 were 12.7% of GDP and are projected to average 14.4% GDP from 2025–2029.

Entrepreneurship

The United States has been a leader in technological innovation since the late 19th century and scientific research since the mid-20th century. In 1876, Alexander Graham Bell was awarded the first U.S. patent for the telephone. Thomas Edison's laboratory developed the phonograph, the first long-lasting light bulb, and the first viable movie camera. Edison's company would also pioneer (direct current based) electric power delivery and market it around the world, followed on by companies such as Westinghouse Electric Corporation which would rapidly develop alternating current power delivery. In the early 20th century, the automobile companies of Ransom E. Olds and Henry Ford popularized the assembly line. The Wright brothers, in 1903, made the first sustained and controlled heavier-than-air powered flight.

American society highly emphasizes entrepreneurship and business. Entrepreneurship is the act of being an entrepreneur, which can be defined as "one who undertakes innovations, finance and business acumen in an effort to transform innovations into economic goods". This may result in new organizations or may be part of revitalizing mature organizations in response to a perceived opportunity. American entrepreneurs are even engaged in public services delivery through public-private partnerships.

The most obvious form of entrepreneurship refers to the process and engagement of starting new businesses (referred to as startup companies); however, in recent years, the term has been extended to include social and political forms of entrepreneurial activity. When entrepreneurship is describing activities within a firm or large organization it is referred to as intra-preneurship and may include corporate venturing, when large entities spin-off organizations.

According to Paul Reynolds, entrepreneurship scholar and creator of the Global Entrepreneurship Monitor, "by the time they reach their retirement years, half of all working men in the United States probably have a period of self-employment of one or more years; one in four may have engaged in self-employment for six or more years. Participating in a new business creation is a common activity among U.S. workers over the course of their careers." And in recent years, business creation has been documented by scholars such as David Audretsch to be a major driver of economic growth in both the United States and Western Europe.

Venture capital investment

Venture capital, as an industry, originated in the United States, which it still dominates. According to the National Venture Capital Association 11% of private sector jobs come from venture capital backed companies and venture capital backed revenue accounts for 21% of U.S. GDP.

Total U.S. investment in venture capital amounted to $48.3billion in 2014, for 4,356 deals. This represented "an increase of 61% in dollars and a 4% increase in deals over the prior year", reported the National Venture Capital Association. The Organisation for Economic Cooperation and Development estimates that venture capital investment in the United States had fully recovered by 2014 to pre-recession levels. The National Venture Capital Association has reported that, in 2014, venture capital investment in the life sciences was at its highest level since 2008: in biotechnology, $6.0billion was invested in 470 deals and, in life sciences overall, $8.6billion in 789 deals (including biotechnology and medical devices). Two thirds (68%) of the investment in biotechnology went to first-time/early-stage development deals and the remainder to the expansion stage of development (14%), seed-stage companies (11%) and late-stage companies (7%). However, it was the software industry which invested in the greatest number of deals overall: 1,799, for an investment of $19.8billion. Second came internet-specific companies, garnering US$11.9billion in investment through 1,005 deals. Many of these companies are based in the state of California, which alone concentrates 28% of U.S. research.

Some new American businesses raise investments from angel investors (venture capitalists). In 2010 healthcare/medical accounted for the largest share of angel investments, with 30% of total angel investments (vs. 17% in 2009), followed by software (16% vs. 19% in 2007), biotech (15% vs. 8% in 2009), industrial/energy (8% vs. 17% in 2009), retail (5% vs. 8% in 2009) and IT services (5%). 

Americans are "venturesome consumers" who are unusually willing to try new products of all sorts, and to pester manufacturers to improve their products.

Mergers and acquisitions

Since 1985 there have been three major waves of M&A in the U.S. (see graph "Mergers and Acquisitions in the U.S. since 1985"). 2017 has been the most active year in terms of number of deals (12,914), whereas 2015 cumulated to the biggest overall value of deals ($24billion).

The biggest merger deal in U.S. history was the acquisition of Time Warner by America Online Inc. in 2000, where the bid was over $164billion. Since 2000 acquisitions of U.S. companies by Chinese investors increased by 368%. The other way round—U.S. companies acquiring Chinese Companies—showed a decrease of 25%, with a short upwards trend until 2007.

Research and development

The U.S. invests more funds in research and development (R&D) in absolute terms than the other G7 nations combined: 17.2% more in 2012. Since 2000, gross domestic expenditure on R&D (GERD) in the U.S. has increased by 31.2%, enabling it to maintain its share of GERD among the G7 nations at 54.0% (54.2% in 2000).

Impact of recession on research spending
Generally speaking, U.S. investment in R&D rose with the economy in the first years of the century before receding slightly during the economic recession then rising again as growth resumed. At its peak in 2009, GERD amounted to US$406billion (2.82% of GDP). Despite the recession, it was still at 2.79% in 2012 and will slide only marginally to 2.73% in 2013, according to provisional data, and should remain at a similar level in 2014.

The federal government is the primary funder of basic research, at 52.6% in 2012; state governments, universities and other non-profits funded 26%. Experimental development, on the other hand, is primarily funded by industry: 76.4% to the federal government's 22.1% in 2012.

While U.S. investment in R&D is high, it failed to reach President Obama's target of 3% of GDP by the end of his presidency in 2016. Between 2009 and 2012, the United States' world share of research expenditure receded slightly from 30.5% to 28.1%. Several countries now devote more than 4% of GDP to R&D (Israel, Japan and the Republic of Korea) and others plan to raise their own GERD/GDP ratio to 4% by 2020 (Finland and Sweden).

Business spending on research
Business enterprises contributed 59.1 % of U.S. GERD in 2012, down from 69.0 % in 2000. Private non-profits and foreign entities each contribute a small fraction of total R&D, 3.3% and 3.8%, respectively. The United States has historically been a leader in business R&D and innovation. The economic recession of 2008–2009 has had a lasting impact, however. While the major performers of R&D largely maintained their commitments, the pain of the U.S. recession was felt mainly by small businesses and start-ups. Statistics released by the U.S. Census Bureau showed that, in 2008, the number of business 'deaths' began overtaking the number of business 'births' and that the trend continued at least through 2012. From 2003 to 2008, business research spending had followed a generally upward trajectory. In 2009, the curve inverted, as expenditure fell by 4% over the previous year then again in 2010, albeit by 1–2% this time. Companies in high-opportunity industries like health care cut back less than those in more mature industries, such as fossil fuels. The largest cutbacks in R&D spending were in agriculture production: −3.5% compared to the average R&D to net sales ratio. The chemicals and allied products industry and electronic equipment industry, on the other hand, showed R&D to net sales ratios that were 3.8% and 4.8% higher than average. Although the amount of R&D spending increased in 2011, it was still below the level of 2008 expenditure. By 2012, the growth rate of business-funded R&D had recovered. Whether this continues will be contingent on the pursuit of economic recovery and growth, levels of federal research funding and the general business climate.

Research spending at the state level

The level of research spending varies considerably from one state to another. Six states (New Mexico, Maryland, Massachusetts, Washington, California and Michigan) each devoted 3.9% or more of their GDP to R&D in 2010, together contributing 42% of national research expenditure. In 2010, more than one quarter of R&D was concentrated in California (28.1%), ahead of Massachusetts (5.7%), New Jersey (5.6%), Washington State (5.5%), Michigan (5.4%), Texas (5.2%), Illinois (4.8%), New York (3.6%) and Pennsylvania (3.5%). Seven states (Arkansas, Nevada, Oklahoma, Louisiana, South Dakota and Wyoming) devoted less than 0.8% of GDP to R&D.

California is home to Silicon Valley, the name given to the area hosting the leading corporations and start-ups in information technology. This state also hosts dynamic biotechnology clusters in the San Francisco Bay Area, Los Angeles and San Diego. The main biotechnology clusters outside California are the cities of Boston/Cambridge, Massachusetts, Maryland, suburban Washington, DC, New York, Seattle, Philadelphia, and Chicago. California supplies 13.7% of all jobs in science and engineering across the country, more than any other state. Some 5.7% of Californians are employed in these fields. This high share reflects a potent combination of academic excellence and a strong business focus on R&D: the prestigious Stanford University and University of California rub shoulders with Silicon Valley, for instance. In much the same way, Route 128 around Boston in the state of Massachusetts is not only home to numerous high-tech firms and corporations but also hosts the renowned Harvard University and Massachusetts Institute of Technology.

New Mexico's high research intensity can be explained by the fact that it hosts the Los Alamos National Laboratory. Maryland's position may reflect the concentration of federally funded research institutions there. Washington State has a high concentration of high-tech firms like Microsoft, Amazon and Boeing and the engineering functions of most automobile manufacturers are located in the state of Michigan.

Research spending by multinational corporations
The federal government and most of the 50 states that make up the United States offer tax credits to particular industries and companies to encourage them to engage in research and development (R&D). Congress usually renews a tax credit every few years. According to a survey by The Wall Street Journal in 2012, companies do not factor in these credits when making decisions about investing in R&D, since they cannot rely on these credits being renewed.

In 2014, four U.S. multinational corporations figured in the Top 50 for the volume of expenditure on R&D: Microsoft, Intel, Johnson & Johnson and Google. Several have figured in the Top 20 for at least ten years: Intel, Microsoft, Johnson & Johnson, Pfizer and IBM. Google was included in this table for the first time in 2013.

Global top 50 companies by R&D volume and intensity, 2014
* R&D intensity is defined as R&D expenditure divided by net sales.
** Although incorporated in the Netherlands, Airbus's principal manufacturing facilities are located in France, Germany, Spain and the UK.
Source: UNESCO Science Report: towards 2030 (2015), Table 9.3, based on Hernández et al. (2014) EU R&D Scoreboard: the 2014 EU Industrial R&D Investment Scoreboard. European Commission: Brussels, Table 2.2.

Exports of high-tech goods and patents

Until 2010, the United States was a net exporter of pharmaceuticals but, since 2011, it has become a net importer of these goods.

The United States is a post-industrial country. Imports of high-tech products far exceed exports. However, the United States' technologically skilled workforce produces a large volume of patents and can still profit from the license or sale of these patents. Within the United States' scientific industries active in research, 9.1% of products and services are concerned with the licensing of intellectual property rights.

When it comes to trade in intellectual property, the United States remains unrivalled. Income from royalties and licensing amounted to $129.2billion in 2013, the highest in the world. Japan comes a distant second, with receipts of $31.6billion in 2013. The United States' payments for use of intellectual property amounted to $39.0billion in 2013, exceeded only by Ireland ($46.4billion).

Notable companies and markets

America's largest companies are ranked every year by revenue in the Fortune 500. Between 2000 and 2022's edition of the list, the top spot on the Fortune 500 was occupied by either the auto manufacturer General Motors (GM), the oil and gas giant ExxonMobil, or the retailer Walmart. Moreover, many of these companies are the most valuable brands, with many of the largest companies by revenue and market cap on the annual ranking of most valuable brands by Forbes being joined by Coca-Cola, The Walt Disney Company, and McDonald's.

Some industries within America are defined by a few major companies, often deriving terms such as "Big Three" or "Big Four". Examples of this phenomenon include the Big Three credit reporting agencies (Equifax, Experian, and TransUnion), the Big Three automobile makers (Ford, General Motors, and Stellantis), the Big Four accounting firms (Deloitte, Ernst & Young, KPMG, and PwC), and the Big Four communications carriers (Verizon, AT&T, T-Mobile/Sprint, and Dish Network).
The American energy industry is among the largest and consists of large companies in oil, natural gas, coal, and renewable energy sources. America's largest energy companies by market are in oil and gas, with ExxonMobil being joined by Chevron, ConocoPhillips, and Schlumberger; British oil companies BP and Shell also have significant presence in the United States and trade on both the London Stock Exchange and New York Stock Exchange. Many large American petroleum companies, as well as BP, can trace some origin back to Standard Oil, a former monopoly run by John D. Rockefeller. In coal, the $30 billion industry is dominated by Peabody Energy, which is the largest coal company in the world with almost $23 billion in revenue for 2021. Much of the nation's coal mining occurs in Wyoming and Appalachian states like West Virginia, Pennsylvania, and Kentucky.

A 2012 Deloitte report published in STORES magazine indicated that of the world's top 250 largest retailers by retail sales revenue in fiscal year 2010, 32% of those retailers were based in the United States, and those 32% accounted for 41% of the total retail sales revenue of the top 250.

America is the foremost country in the world when it comes to semiconductor production. In 2011, half of the world's 20 largest semiconductor manufacturers by sales were based in America. More recently, Congress under the presidency of Joe Biden passed a bipartisan bill, the CHIPS and Science Act, which bolstered semiconductor production. Some of America's largest semiconductor firms and chip companies are Broadcom, Intel, AMD, and Qualcomm.

Many of the United States' largest firms by market cap are technology companies. These companies are dominated by the Big Five tech giants (Apple, Amazon, Google, Microsoft, and Meta), though numerous software firms also dominate the American technology industry. These firms range from hardware manufacturers like Dell Technologies, IBM, Hewlett-Packard, and Cisco, to software and computing infrastructure programmers like Oracle, Salesforce, Adobe, and Intuit.

In film, American producers create nearly all of the world's highest-grossing films. Many of the world's best-selling music artists are based in the United States. Some of America's largest media companies are The Walt Disney Company, Warner Bros. Discovery, Netflix, Comcast, Paramount Global, and Fox.

Finance

Measured by value of its listed companies' securities, the New York Stock Exchange is more than three times larger than any other stock exchange in the world. As of October 2008, the combined capitalization of all domestic NYSE listed companies was US$10.1trillion. NASDAQ is another American stock exchange and the world's third-largest exchange after the New York Stock Exchange and Japan's Tokyo Stock Exchange. However, NASDAQ's trade value is larger than Japan's TSE. NASDAQ is the largest electronic screen-based equity securities trading market in the U.S. With approximately 3,800 companies and corporations, it has more trading volume per hour than any other stock exchange.

Because of the influential role that the U.S. stock market plays in international finance, a New York University study in late 2014 interprets that in the short run, stocks that affect the willingness to bear risk independently of macroeconomic fundamentals explain most of the variation in the U.S. stock market. In the long run, the U.S. stock market is profoundly affected by shocks that reallocate the rewards of a given level of production between workers and shareholders. Productivity shocks, however, play a small role in historical stock market fluctuations at all horizons in the U.S. stock market.

The U.S. finance industry comprised only 10% of total non-farm business profits in 1947, but it grew to 50% by 2010. Over the same period, finance industry income as a proportion of GDP rose from 2.5% to 7.5%, and the finance industry's proportion of all corporate income rose from 10% to 20%. The mean earnings per employee hour in finance relative to all other sectors has closely mirrored the share of total U.S. income earned by the top 1% income earners since 1930. The mean salary in New York City's finance industry rose from $80,000 in 1981 to $360,000 in 2011, while average New York City salaries rose from $40,000 to $70,000. In 1988, there were about 12,500 U.S. banks with less than $300million in deposits, and about 900 with more deposits, but by 2012, there were only 4,200 banks with less than $300million in deposits in the U.S., and over 1,800 with more.

Top ten U.S. banks by assets
|1|| JP Morgan Chase
|2||Bank of America
|3||Citigroup
|4||Wells Fargo
|5||Goldman Sachs
|6||Morgan Stanley
|7||U.S. Bancorp
|8||Bank of NY Mellon
|9||HSBC North American Holdings
|10||Capital One Financial

A 2012 International Monetary Fund study concluded that the U.S. financial sector has grown so large that it is slowing economic growth. New York University economist Thomas Philippon supported those findings, estimating that the U.S. spends $300billion too much on financial services per year, and that the sector needs to shrink by 20%. Harvard University and University of Chicago economists agreed, calculating in 2014 that workers in research and development add $5 to the GDP for each dollar they earn, but finance industry workers cause the GDP to shrink by $0.60 for every dollar they are paid. A study by the Bank for International Settlements reached similar conclusions, saying the finance industry impedes economic growth and research and development based industries.

Historical statistics

List of state and territory economies

State and federal district economies

Territory economies
 Economy of American Samoa
 Economy of Guam
 Economy of the Northern Mariana Islands
 Economy of Puerto Rico
 Economy of the United States Virgin Islands

See also

 Bretton Woods system
 Energy policy of the United States
 Financial position of the United States
 Historical Statistics of the United States
 Job creation index
 Labor unions in the United States
 List of industry trade groups in the United States
 Washington Consensus
 World oil market chronology from 2003

References

Citations

Sources

 
 

 
United States
United States